Lušečka Vas is a village west of Poljčane in northeastern Slovenia. The area is part of the traditional region of Styria. It is now included with the rest of the Municipality of Poljčane in the Drava Statistical Region.

References

External links
 
Lušečka Vas on Geopedia

Populated places in the Municipality of Poljčane